Bileh is a self-styled "spokesman" for Somali pirates operating off the coast of Somalia and based in the town of Eyl in Puntland. The name means above or superior.

He has issued threats on behalf of his group through the media. Recently, when pirates seized a Ukrainian ship carrying arms to Kenya, a New York Times report intimated that there was a means of directing questions to him.
Bileh is an African name sometimes spelled as Belay and pronounced as Bee-Lay.  

The name Belay is also part of Ethiopian history, Belay Zelleke was born in 1896 in the Wollo province of Ethiopia to a mother of Wollo Borena and to a father of Gojam Berenta origins.  
In 1935 Italy invaded Ethiopia.  Like the many patriotic Ethiopians, Belay Zeleke felt the need to defend his country and led an insurgency movement against the occupation in Gojam.

References

Somalian pirates
Ethnic Somali people
21st-century pirates
Year of birth missing (living people)
Living people